H05 is a regional road (H-Highway) in Crimea, Ukraine. It runs north-south and connects Krasnoperekopsk with Simferopol. Since the 2014 annexation of Crimea by the Russian Federation, the route was given another code 35K-001.

Main route

Main route and connections to/intersections with other highways in Ukraine.

See also

 Roads in Ukraine

References

External links
Regional Roads in Ukraine in Russian

Roads in Crimea
Roads in Ukraine